Kostas Pilea   (born 11 December 1998) is a Cypriot professional footballer who plays as a left back for Cypriot club Aris Limassol.

Career

Anorthosis
Kostas Pilea made his debut for Anorthosis in a match against Apollon Limassol.

References

External links

1998 births
Living people
Cypriot footballers
Anorthosis Famagusta F.C. players
Cypriot First Division players
Association football defenders